The Tbilisi Higher Artillery Command School was one of the military institutions of the USSR. In different years she trained specialists of various military specialties. It was located in Tbilisi in the Georgian SSR.

History 
The school was founded on 8 November 1864 by the governor of the Caucasus, Grand Duke Mikhail Nikolayevich of Russia. In 1992, the Tbilisi Higher Artillery Command School was moved and reorganized into the Ekaterinburg Higher Artillery Command School in Yekaterinburg, Russia. It is the predecessor in military education to the David Aghmashenebeli National Defense Academy.

Aspects of the school 
It has the honorific of 26 Baku Commissars, with its full name being the Tbilisi Higher Artillery Command School named after the 26 Baku Commissars. Graduates of the school were distributed into artillery units of the Soviet Ground Forces, the Soviet Naval Infantry and the Soviet airborne. In 1965, the school, opened a military parade on Rustaveli Avenue in honor of the 20th anniversary of the end of the Second World War. During the Soviet–Afghan War, 50-75% of all cadets were deployed to Afghanistan. In August 2000, an alumni association was created, with 1971 graduate Ilya Novzhilov at its head.

Notable alumni 
 Museyib Allahverdiyev, Red Army major from Azerbaijan.
 Vladimir Arshba, the first Minister of Defence of the Republic of Abkhazia.
 Hamazasp Babadzhanian, a Soviet Armenian Chief marshal of the armored troops.
 Giorgi Karkarashvili, Georgian Minister of Defense from May 1993 to March 1994
 Yuri Khatchaturov, former Secretary-General of the Collective Security Treaty Organization and former Chief of the General Staff of the Armed Forces of Armenia.
Oleg Bazhenov, Deputy Minister of EMERCOM.

See also 
Baku Higher All-Arms Command School
TVOKU
National Defense Academy (Georgia)

References 

Educational institutions established in 1864
Military education and training in Georgia (country)
Education and training establishments of the Soviet Army
Military command schools
1864 establishments in the Russian Empire